Nectanebo II was the last native ruler of Ancient Egypt, as well as the third and last pharaoh from the Thirtieth Dynasty of Egypt. He reigned from 358 to 340 BC.

Under Nectanebo II, Egypt prospered. During his reign, the Egyptian artists developed a specific style that left a distinctive mark on the reliefs of the Ptolemaic Kingdom. Like his indirect predecessor Nectanebo I, Nectanebo II showed enthusiasm for many of the cults of the gods within ancient Egyptian religion, and more than a hundred Egyptian sites bear evidence of his attentions. Nectanebo II, however, undertook more constructions and restorations than Nectanebo I, commencing in particular the enormous Egyptian temple of Isis (the Iseum).

For several years, Nectanebo II was successful in keeping Egypt safe from the Achaemenid Empire. However, betrayed by his former servant, Mentor of Rhodes, Nectanebo II was ultimately defeated. The Persians occupied Memphis and then seized the rest of Egypt, incorporating the country into the Achaemenid Empire under Artaxerxes III. Nectanebo fled south and preserved his power for some time; his subsequent fate is unknown.

Name
His Egyptian name was Nḫt-Ḥr-Ḥbt, which means "victorious is Horus of Hebyt". Although convention in English assigns identical names to him and his grandfather, Nectanebo I, the latter was in fact called .

The Medieval Arab authors referred to him as Naqatanibas.

Portraits

Except for the small-scale greywacke statue in the Metropolitan Museum of Art, which shows Nectanebo II standing before the image of Horus, no other annotated portraits of Nectanebo II are known. In the greywacke statue, Nectanebo II is shown in a nemes and uraeus. His bent arm with the sword stands for the hieroglyph nakht, the falcon represents Horus, while the hieroglyph in Nectanebo's right hand stands for heb. Other portraits attributed to Nectanebo II (all featuring the khepresh) include a quartzite head in the museum of the University of Pennsylvania Museum of Archaeology and Anthropology, a basalt head in Alexandria, a granite head acquired by the Museum of Fine Arts, Boston and a damaged quartzite head.

Rise to power

In 525 BC, Egypt was conquered by the Achaemenid Empire. Because of internal struggles for the Persian imperial succession, Egypt managed to regain independence in 404 BC. In 389 BC, Pharaoh Hakor negotiated a treaty with Athens and for three years (from 385 to 383 BC) managed to withstand Persian aggression. However, following the conclusion of the Peace of Antalcidas in 387 BC between the Achaemenids and the Greek city-states, Egypt and Cyprus became the only obstacles to Persian hegemony in the Mediterranean.

At the beginning of 360 BC, Nectanebo's predecessor, Teos, started preparations for war against intruders. In the same year, the Egyptian army set off, traveling along the coast by land and sea. Nectanebo II accompanied his uncle Teos in that campaign and was in charge of the machimoi.

In an attempt to quickly raise finances for the war, Teos imposed taxes on Egyptians and seized temple property. Egyptians, particularly the priests, resented these measures but supported Nectanebo II. Teos asked Spartan military leader Agesilaus and Athenian general Chabrias to support him. Agesilaus, however, said he was sent to aid Egypt and not to wage war against it. Chabrias returned home with his mercenaries. Teos decided to flee to the Achaemenid court, where he ultimately died of natural causes.

Nectanebo contended with an unnamed pretender to the throne from the town of Mendes, who proclaimed himself pharaoh. The revolt was probably led by one of the descendants of Nepherites I, whose family had ruled the town before. The claimant sent messengers to Agesilaus in an attempt to persuade Agesilaus to his side. Agesilaus remained loyal to Nectanebo, fearing to become a turncoat. At one of the towns in the Nile Delta, the troops of Nectanebo and Agesilaus were besieged by the usurper, who had gained many sympathisers. Despite the enemy's numerical superiority, Nectanebo and Agesilaus were victorious and the revolt was put down in the fall of 360 BC. Acknowledging Agesilaus, Nectanebo sent him 220 talents of gold.

Reign

Religion played an important part in Nectanebo's domestic policy. He began his reign by officiating over the funeral of an Apis bull in Memphis. There, Nectanebo added a relief decoration to the eastern and western temples of Apis. Among notable sanctuaries erected under Nectanebo II are a temple of Khnum in Abu and a temple of Amun at Sekhtam. He also dedicated a diorite naos to Anhur-Shu (a fragment of it was found in the temples of Tjebnutjer). Nectanebo II was responsible for the increasing popularity of the Buchis cult. Under Nectanebo II a decree forbidding stone quarrying in the so-called "Mysterious Mountains" in Abydos was issued.

Foreign affairs under Nectanebo II were thwarted by repeated Achaemenid attempts to reoccupy Egypt. Before the accession of Nectanebo II to the throne, the Persians attempted to reclaim Egypt in 385, 383, and 373 BC. Nectanebo used the peace to build up a new army and employed Greek mercenaries, which was a common practice at the time. In about 351 BC, the Achaemenid Empire embarked on a new attempt to reclaim Egypt. After a year of fighting, Nectanebo and his allied generals,  and Lamius of Sparta, managed to defeat the Achaemenids. Having scored a resounding victory, Nectanebo II was acclaimed "Nectanebo the divine falcon" by his people, and cults were set up in his name.

In 345/44 BC, Nectanebo supported the Phoenician rebellion against the Achaemenid Empire, led by the king of Sidon, Tennes, and dispatched military aid in the form of 4,000 Greek mercenaries, led by Mentor of Rhodes. However, having heard of the approach of the forces of Artaxerxes III, Mentor opened communication with the Persians in collusion with Tennes.

At the end of 344 BC, ambassadors of Artaxerxes III arrived in Greece, asking for the Greeks' participation in a campaign against Egypt. Athens and Sparta treated the ambassadors with courtesy, but refrained from committing to an alliance against Egypt. Other cities, however, decided to support the Persians: Thebes sent 1,000 hoplites and Argos 3,000.

In the winter of 343 BC, Artaxerxes set off for Egypt. The Egyptian army, headed by Nectanebo, consisted of 60,000 Egyptians, 20,000 Libu, and as many Greek mercenaries. In addition, Nectanebo had a number of flat-bottomed boats intended to prevent an enemy from entering the Nile mouths. The vulnerable points along his Mediterranean sea border and east boundary were protected by strongholds, fortifications and entrenched camps. Persian forces were strengthened by Mentor and his men, well acquainted with the eastern border of Egypt, and by 6,000 Ionians.

Nectanebo II was ultimately defeated and, in the summer of 342 BC, Artaxerxes entered Memphis and installed a satrap. Nectanebo fled to Upper Egypt and finally to Nubia, where he was granted asylum. He, however, preserved a degree of power there for some time. With the help of Khabash, Nectanebo made a vain attempt to regain the throne.

Legacy

Building campaigns
Though placed in an unfortunate period of Egyptian history, and with his legacy perhaps marred by being "the last pharaoh" to rule an autonomous Egypt, Nectanebo was an extensive builder, likely on a scale that would equal many kings of the glory days of the New Kingdom. References to either Nectanebo II or his grandfather have been found almost ubiquitously at the premier religious centres, and the piety of the two kings matched those of the great kings of the past, attested to by the numerous monuments across Egypt bearing their names. Nectanebo II, specifically, built and improved temples across the country, and he donated extensively to the priesthoods of the plethora of sites which he donated to. Nectanebo's name has been found at Heliopolis, Athribis, and Bubastis in the Nile Delta, among other places, but he built most extensively at Sebennytos, including the modern site of Behbeit El Hagar. The reliefs of the temples at Sebennytos would leave a distinct mark on the art of the later Ptolemaic Kingdom. The religious focus of his building campaigns, however, may not be solely due to sheer piety; because Nectanebo was an usurper, he likely sought to legitimise his rule over Egypt religiously.

Nectanebo and the Alexander Romance

There is an apocryphal tale appearing in the pseudo-historical Alexander romance that details another end for the last native pharaoh. Soon after Alexander the Great's godhood was confirmed by the Libyan Sibyl of Zeus Ammon at the Siwa Oasis, a rumor was begun that Nectanebo II, following defeat in his last battle, did not travel to Nubia but instead to the court of Philip II of Macedon in the guise of an Egyptian magician. There, while Philip was away on campaign, Nectanebo convinced Philip's wife Olympias that Amun was to come to her and that they would father a son. Nectanebo, disguising himself as Amun, slept with Olympias and from this event came Alexander.

This myth would hold strong appeal for the Egyptians, who desired continuity and harbored a strong dislike for foreign rule. In art of this event, Nectanebo is usually depicted as having dragon-like features, for example in the Speculum Historiale.

In the early Ptolemaic tale of Nectanebo and Petesis, preserved only in a Greek fragment from the Serapeum of Saqqara, the pharaoh has a prophetic dream of Isis in which the god Onuris is angry with him because of his unfinished temple in Sebennytos. Nectanebo calls in the best sculptor of the realm, Petesis, to finish the job, but he bungles his assignment when he gets drunk and chases a beautiful girl instead. The narrative ends abruptly here, but this is probably the preface to the fall of Egypt. Al-Biruni's A History of India reproduces the story.

The legend of Nectanebo (or Nectanebus, or Natanabo, as reported in some versions of the Alexander Romance) left a profound mark on European culture up to the Renaissance and beyond. It is no coincidence that this character is included in the Sola Busca tarot (with the name Natanabo) together with other important "actors" of the same legend: Alexander, Philip of Macedon, Olympias and Ammon.  An alchemical interpretation of this character was provided by the Italian scholar Sofia Di Vincenzo in a study on the Sola Busca Tarot, where she explains that Natanabo represents a celestial messenger who came to earth with a gift, the helmet, which is a symbol of invulnerability and both physical and mental potency.

References

 
 
 
 

Pharaohs of the Thirtieth Dynasty of Egypt
Year of birth unknown
Year of death unknown